Skorpiovenator ("scorpion hunter") is a genus of abelisaurid theropod dinosaur from the Late Cretaceous (Cenomanian to Turonian) Huincul Formation of Argentina. It is one of the most complete and informative abelisaurids yet known, described from a nearly complete and articulated skeleton.

Description 

It had short, stubby, near-useless arms, but strong legs with powerful thighs and sturdy shins over which its large body was balanced.

Skull 
Skorpiovenators skull was short, stout and covered in the ridges, furrows, tubercles and bumpy nodules that are scattered over the heads of most abelisaurid theropods. It is craniocaudally short, similar to Carnotaurus, and is shorter and deeper than the skulls of Abelisaurus and Majungasaurus. Notably, the maxilla and lacrimal of Skorpiovenator are wider than in the corresponding bones of the remaining abelisaurids.

Skorpiovenator had 19 maxillary teeth, which is more than any other known abelisaurid. The shape of the crowns of the teeth is similar to other abelisaurids, and exhibit enamel wrinkles and marginal serrations.

 Discovery and naming 
 
The type specimen was described and named by Canale, Scanferla, Agnolin, and Novas in 2009 (though the paper was released as an advanced publication online in 2008). The name Skorpiovenator bustingorryi is derived from the Greek and Latin for "scorpion hunter," due to the abundant scorpions present at the dig site, and the specific name honors Manuel Bustingorry, who owned the farm where the specimen was found. The describers have defined a new name Brachyrostra for a clade, to which Skorpiovenator belonged.

The type species, Skorpiovenator bustingorryi, is known from a single, nearly complete skeleton (MMCH-PV 48K) missing only sections of the tail and the majority of the forelimbs. The specimen was recovered from the lower part of the Huincul Formation in Patagonia, dating to the late Cenomanian stage, about 95 million years ago. It would have lived alongside other carnivorous dinosaurs such as the carcharodontosaurid Mapusaurus and another abelisaurid, Ilokelesia. The remains are deposited in the Ernesto Bachmann Paleontological Museum of Villa El Chocón, Patagonia, Argentina.

 Classification 
In 2008, Canale et al. published a phylogenetic analysis focusing on the South American carnotaurines. In their results, they found that all South American forms (including Skorpiovenator) grouped together as a sub-clade of Carnotaurinae, which they named Brachyrostra''', meaning "short snouts". They defined the clade Brachyrostra as "all the abelisaurids more closely related to Carnotaurus sastrei than to Majungasaurus crenatissimus''."

See also 
 Timeline of ceratosaur research

References 

Brachyrostrans
Late Cretaceous dinosaurs of South America
Cenomanian life
Cretaceous Argentina
Fossils of Argentina
Huincul Formation
Fossil taxa described in 2009
Taxa named by Fernando Novas